The Microregion of Nhandeara is located on the northwest of São Paulo state, Brazil, and is made up of 9 municipalities. It belongs to the Mesoregion of São José do Rio Preto.

The microregion has a population of 65,337 inhabitants, in an area of 2,016.7 km²

Municipalities 
The microregion consists of the following municipalities, listed below with their 2010 Census populations (IBGE/2010):

Macaubal: 7,663
Monções: 2,132
Monte Aprazível: 21,746
Neves Paulista: 8,772
Nhandeara: 10,725
Nipoã: 4,274
Poloni: 5,395
Sebastianópolis do Sul: 3,031
União Paulista: 1,599

References

Nhandeara